Spaarnestad Photo is an independent institution formerly located on the Nassaulaan in Haarlem, in the Netherlands, whose goal is to preserve around 13 million photos. It was founded in 1985. In 2008, the photographic archives of Spaarnestad Photo were moved to the Nationaal Archief in The Hague. The Spaarnestad Photo archives worked with the Nationaal Archief and Wikipedia to make its archives partly available with Creative Commons licenses. Well over 10,000 photographs from Spaarnestad were placed on Wikimedia Commons between 2010 and 2017.

References

External links

 

Photo archives in the Netherlands
Organisations based in The Hague
History of Haarlem